Polyxo (minor planet designation: 308 Polyxo) is a main-belt asteroid that was discovered by A. Borrelly on March 31, 1891, in Marseilles. The orbital plane is tilted at an angle of 4.36° to the plane of the ecliptic.

308 Polyxo is classified as a rare T-type asteroid, with a spectrum that bears some similarity to the Tagish Lake meteorite. A spectral feature at a wavelength of  suggests aqueous alteration of some surface materials. Photometric measurements reported in 1983 give a rotation period of 12.03 hours and a brightness variation of 0.20 in magnitude. The adaptive optics instrument at the W. M. Keck Observatory shows an oblate object with a diameter of 130 km. The size ratio between the major and minor axes is 1.26 ± 0.11. Light curves for this object suggests it has a very irregular shape.

Stellar occultation events were observed for this asteroid during 2000 and 2004. The resulting chords provided cross-section diameter estimates of 144.4 and 117.1 km, respectively.

References

External links 
 
 

000308
Discoveries by Alphonse Borrelly
Named minor planets
000308
000308
18910331